Clavelina elegans is a tunicate species in the genus Clavelina. It is found in Japan.

References

External links 

 Clavelina elegans on www.marinespecies.org

Enterogona
Animals described in 1927
Fauna of Japan